Berger Torrissen or Birger Tørrissen (September 16, 1901 – February 28, 1991) was an American skier.

He was born in Sørreisa, Norway, and later immigrated to the United States. He competed for the United States in Nordic combined and cross-country skiing at the 1936 Winter Olympics with the best result of 11th place in the 4 × 10 km relay. Torrissen coached the US cross-country team at the 1950 World Championships and oversaw the biathlon competition and ski-jumping hill at the 1960 Winter Olympics. He was a brother-in-law of Karl Magnus Satre and Paul Ottar Satre.

References

External links

1901 births
1991 deaths
People from Sørreisa
Norwegian emigrants to the United States
American male cross-country skiers
American male Nordic combined skiers
Olympic Nordic combined skiers of the United States
Olympic cross-country skiers of the United States
Nordic combined skiers at the 1936 Winter Olympics
Cross-country skiers at the 1936 Winter Olympics